Haitang or Hai Tang may refer to:

Malus spectabilis or haitang, a flowering tree native to China
Hai-Tang, 1930 British-German drama film

Places in China
Haitang Bay, in Sanya, Hainan
Haitang District, Sanya
Haitang, Chongqing
Haitang, Ganluo County, Sichuan
Haitang Subdistrict, Hefei, Anhui
Haitang Subdistrict, Leshan, Sichuan

See also
Typhoon Haitang (disambiguation), typhoons named Haitang